Brucella endophytica is a Gram-negative, aerobic, rod-shaped and bacteria from the genus of Brucella which has been isolated from the roots of the plant Glycyrrhiza uralensis from Yuli County in China.

References

External links
Type strain of Ochrobactrum endophyticum at BacDive -  the Bacterial Diversity Metadatabase

Hyphomicrobiales
Bacteria described in 2016